East Linton (Kerr Field) Aerodrome  is located adjacent to East Linton, Ontario, Canada.

References

Registered aerodromes in Ontario